Ignatz Leo Nascher (11 October 1863 – 25 December 1944) an Austrian-American doctor and gerontologist. He coined the term "geriatrics" in 1909. Born in Vienna, Nascher immigrated to the United States at a young age. His ideas on geriatrics, published in the New York Medical Journal, helped lay the groundwork for the modern study of ageing and elder care.

Biography 
Nascher was born in Vienna, Austria on 11 October 1863, and immigrated to New York City where he was brought up Later he also assumed US-citizenship. He drew on the Austrian system of care for the elderly. John Morley wrote that Nascher was "truly a polymath and a pioneer, whose ideas and efforts were underappreciated by his peers."

Nascher graduated from college with a degree in pharmacy in 1882 at the age of 19. Several years later he completed his MD and began private practice to which he devoted the first years of his career. During his time he published articles including "A Young Living Fetus" (Medical Record of New York, 1889), an article on prostitution in 1908 and "Tissue Cell Evolution" (New York Medical Journal, 1910).

Geriatrics 
He wrote, "Geriatrics, from geras, old age, and iatrikos, relating to the physician, is a term I would suggest as an addition to our vocabulary to cover the same field that is covered in old age that is covered by the term pediatrics in childhood, to emphasize the necessity of considering senility and its disease apart from maturity and to assign it a separate place in medicine."  This was originally published in an article entitled "Geriatrics" in the New York Medical Journal (1909; 90: 358-9).

His 1909 article broke with prevailing views on aging. Nascher wrote that "senility is a distinct period of life, a physiological entity as much so as the period of a childhood." This emphasis on physiological processes and mechanisms of aging and senescence challenged the "pathological model" of aging that was then "the primary focus of medical researchers, including Nobel Laureate Elie Metchnikoff."  Nascher addressed and rejected Metchnikoff's theory that aging was caused by tissue phagocytosis and "autointoxication" (the absorption of intestinal decompositions), for which Metchnikoff prescribed yoghurt.

Nascher argued that the disease and medical care of the aged should be considered a separate specialty. His published research included the first U.S. textbook on geriatric medicine. Nascher founded the New York Geriatrics Society in 1915. Two years later, he started a regular feature in the Medical Review of Reviews. He was named the American Geriatrics Society's honorary president at their first meeting in June 1942.

Initially, Nascher encountered resistance from his colleagues. He had difficulty finding a publisher for his 1914 book, Geriatrics: The Diseases of Old Age and Their Treatment (Philadelphia: P. Blakiston's Son & Co). The book has three major sections: physiologic old age, pathologic old age and hygiene and medicolegal relations. Nascher concluded, as do most geriatricians today, "senescence is not due to any one cause."  "[D]isease is not (always) a causative or even an essential factor." The Canadian Medical Association Journal reviewed the book in 1914 finding the book most interesting and valuable. The 517-page book was reprinted in 1979 by Ayer Publishers.

Nascher observed a fundamental antipathy towards the elderly in society: "The idea of economic worthlessness instills a spirit of irritability if not positive enmity against the helplessness of the aged."

References

Other sources
 "A Brief History of Geriatrics," J. Morley, Journal of Gerontology, November 1, 2004; Vol. 59, Issue 11, pp. 1132–1152 subscription required
 "A Brief History of Geriatrics," Newsletter of the Division of Geriatric Medicine, Department of Internal Medicine, Saint Louis University School of Medicine, Spring 2006 Vol XVI No 3 PDF online ([sic], same title, different article)
 "Dr. Ignatz Nascher and the birth of geriatrics," CAN MED ASSOC J 1990; 143 (9) 945 
 "Letter from an Old Country: History of Geriatrics," by A. Mark Clarfield, MD, CCFP, FRCPC, Annals of Long-Term Care  - Volume 9 - Issue 07 - July 2001 

1863 births
1944 deaths
American geriatricians
Austro-Hungarian emigrants to the United States